Avinabo Bag (born 8 September 1989 in West Bengal) is an Indian footballer who plays as a defender for Mohammedan SC in the I-League.

Career

Pailan Arrows
During the summer of 2011 Bag joined Pailan Arrows of the I-League from Kalighat MS. Bag made his professional debut for Pailan against Salgaocar on 28 October 2012 in the I-League. Pailan lost the match 0–4. He then scored his first goal of his career on 28 August 2012 against Air India FC during the 2012 Durand Cup in which Pailan drew 1–1 and we knocked-out by 2 points.

Eagles
On 5 December 2013 it was announced that Bag has signed up with Eagles F.C. of Kerala on loan for 2013-14 season along with Nadong Bhutia, Bijendra Rai, Jagroop Singh, Bisheshwor Singh, Biswajit Saha, Ramandeep Singh and Govin Singh. Moreover, IMG-Reliance, the organisers of the proposed IPL-style football tournament Indian Super League, and Eagles F.C. will facilitate a two to six week training stint for the eight players with UK based Reading F.C. Academy.

Mohammedan SC
I-League club Mohammedan SC signed former Kerala Blasters FC midfielder Avinabo Bag for I-League 2020–21 Season.

Career statistics

Club
Statistics accurate as of 6 January 2013

References

Indian footballers
1989 births
Living people
Footballers from West Bengal
I-League players
Indian Arrows players
Indian Super League players
Kerala Blasters FC players
Association football fullbacks
Kerala Blasters FC draft picks
East Bengal Club players
Mohammedan SC (Kolkata) players
Peerless SC players